Shenandoah Valley Military Academy, also known as Shenandoah Valley Academy, was an independent boarding school for boys in Winchester, Virginia, USA. It closed in 1934.

See also
 Shenandoah Valley Academy - Modern boarding school located in New Market, Virginia run by the Seventh-day Adventists

Education in Virginia
Education in Winchester, Virginia
Defunct United States military academies